Bella Smith (born 20 September 2001) is a professional Australian rules footballer who plays for Sydney in the AFL Women's (AFLW). She played for Norwood in the SANFL Women's League (SANFLW) before she was signed to an AFLW contract by Collingwood as an undrafted free agent.

Early life and state football
Smith was born in the town Cleve in the Eyre Peninsula. She played junior football for Port Pirie. In 2016, she represented South Australia at the Australian Football Under 15 Championship in Maroochydore, wearing the number 20 guernsey, like her father. After this she started playing for Norwood's under-16 side. All together Smith played three seasons for Norwood in the SANFL Women's League (SANFLW). After playing 10 matches in 2019, she decided to focus on playing football.

During her time playing state football, she also represented South Australia, playing for the Central Allies at the 2018 AFL Women's Under 18 Championships, though she was injured in the last match against Vic Metro. The following year, she once again played for the Central Allies at the 2019 AFL Women's Under 18 Championships. She scored a goal in their victory over the Eastern Allies and was one of the best players in their loss to Western Australia.

In September 2020, Smith played for Team Marinoff in the SANFLW All-Stars match, putting in a strong showing in defence, denying certain goals and marking strongly.

As well as football, Smith has played softball and cricket. She played at Port Neill Cricket Club and Kensington Cricket Club. From 2017, she also represented South Australia in their under-18 cricket side. She played junior cricket for three years at national level.

AFLW career
Smith joined Collingwood as an undrafted free agent, following the 2020 AFL Women's draft, re-joining coach Stephen Symonds who had coached her at Norwood. Smith played in her first official hit-out in the first practice match of the season, playing against North Melbourne at Ikon Park. Less than two weeks later, she made her debut in the first match of the 2021 AFL Women's season against Carlton at Ikon Park, playing as a forward after playing the pre-season practice match in the ruck and the forward line. In May 2022, Smith left Collingwood to join Sydney, one of the expansion clubs of the 2023 AFL Women's season.

Style of play
Smith is originally a rebounding defender, but also has the ability to play up forward as Collingwood used her in the beginning of the 2021 AFL Women's season. She has strong hands and kicks with her left foot.

Personal life
Smith's uncle, Darren Smith, played 302 games for Port Adelaide in the South Australian National Football League (SANFL), winning seven premierships with them and also played two seasons in the Australian Football League (AFL) with Adelaide in their first two years in the competition. She lives in Melbourne with her team-mate Ebony O'Dea. She also works as a teacher's aide at SEDA College.

Statistics
Statistics are correct to the end of the 2022 season.

|- style="background-color: #eaeaea"
! scope="row" style="text-align:center" | 2021
|style="text-align:center;"|
| 19 || 6 || 0 || 0 || 12 || 16 || 28 || 6 || 9 || 0.0 || 0.0 || 2.0 || 2.7 || 4.7 || 1.0 || 1.5
|- 
! scope="row" style="text-align:center" | 2022
|style="text-align:center;"|
| 19 || 4 || 0 || 0 || 9 || 7 || 16 || 4 || 7 || 0.0 || 0.0 || 2.3 || 1.8 || 4.0 || 1.0 || 1.8
|- class="sortbottom"
! colspan=3| Career
! 10
! 0
! 0
! 21
! 23
! 44
! 10
! 16
! 0.0
! 0.0
! 2.1
! 2.3
! 4.4
! 1.0
! 1.6
|}

References

External links
 
 
 

2001 births
Living people
Collingwood Football Club (AFLW) players
Australian rules footballers from South Australia
Sportswomen from South Australia
Sydney Swans (AFLW) players